Dimitar Vakavliev (born 9 December 1990 in Stara Zagora) is a Bulgarian football player. He plays as a defender for Rozova Dolina.

External links

1990 births
Living people
Bulgarian footballers
Association football defenders
First Professional Football League (Bulgaria) players
PFC Beroe Stara Zagora players
FC Lyubimets players
FC Vereya players
Sportspeople from Stara Zagora